Peter Imasuen is an Anglican bishop in Nigeria.

Imasuen is the current Bishop of Benin; he was enthroned as Bishop of Benin in 2004.

Notes

Living people
Anglican bishops of Benin
21st-century Anglican bishops in Nigeria
Year of birth missing (living people)